N. R. Sivapathi is an Indian politician and incumbent member of the Tamil Nadu legislative assembly from Musiri constituency.

Sivapathi was sacked as Minister for Animal Husbandry in November 2011 as part of the third cabinet reshuffle in a five-month period by Chief Minister Jayalalithaa.

References 

All India Anna Dravida Munnetra Kazhagam politicians
Living people
State cabinet ministers of Tamil Nadu
St Joseph's College, Tiruchirappalli alumni
Year of birth missing (living people)
Tamil Nadu MLAs 1991–1996